Mitchel B. Wallerstein is an American educator, philanthropist, policy expert, and former senior official of the federal government of the United States. He is the President Emeritus of Baruch College of the City University of New York and is currently appointed as a University Professor. In 2021, he was also appointed as a Non-resident Senior Fellow on U.S. Foreign Policy at the Chicago Council on Global Affairs. From 2003 to 2010, Wallerstein served as dean of the Maxwell School of Citizenship and Public Affairs at Syracuse University, which is ranked as the nation's leading school of public and international affairs.

Biography

Early life
Born in New York City, Wallerstein received his undergraduate degree at Dartmouth College in 1971. In 1972, he followed with a Master's degree in public administration from the Maxwell School of Citizenship and Public Affairs. He received a second Master's (1976) and PhD in political science from the Massachusetts Institute of Technology in 1978.

For the next five years, he worked as an assistant professor and program director at MIT. From 1983 to 1993, he worked at the National Academy of Sciences, holding progressively more senior positions, including deputy executive officer of the National Research Council.  Also while at the National Research Council, Wallerstein directed a series of highly acclaimed studies on scientific communication, technology transfer and national security.

Career
From 1993 to 1998, he was appointed as Deputy Assistant Secretary of Defense for Counterproliferation Policy and was simultaneously the Senior Defense Representative for Trade Security Policy. While at the Department of Defense, Wallerstein helped to found and co-chaired NATO's Senior Defense Group on Proliferation. He received the Secretary of Defense Medal for Outstanding Public Service in January 1997 from Secretary William Perry, and he was presented with the Bronze Palm to that award in April 1998 by Secretary of Defense William Cohen. During his time in Washington, DC, he also served as an adjunct professor at the Program on Science, Technology and Policy at the George Washington University, the Walsh School of Foreign Service at Georgetown University, and the Paul H. Nitze School of Advanced International Studies at Johns Hopkins University. Wallerstein was named a Distinguished Research Professor at the National Defense University in November 1997.

In 1998, Wallerstein joined the John D. and Catherine T. MacArthur Foundation as Vice President of the Program on Global Security and Sustainability. In this capacity, he directed the Foundation's international grant-making in 86 countries around the world.  The Program made $85 million in grants each year focusing on international peace and security, population and reproductive health, biodiversity and sustainable development, human rights and the impacts of globalization.

In July 2003, Wallerstein became 8th dean of the Maxwell School of Citizenship and Public Affairs at Syracuse University. Wallerstein pushed for expanded internationalization of the school's programs and relationships with other elite schools of public affairs around the world; he secured an endowment for the School's Institute of Global Affairs in honor of the late Senator Daniel Patrick Moynihan, who was twice a member of the Maxwell School faculty; and he initiated new academic programs in security studies (which included the establishment of the Institute for National Security and Counter-Terrorism), and he supported new programs in public diplomacy, and history and documentary filmmaking.  He also raised a significant amount of new endowment funding for new Chairs and other programmatic support for the Maxwell School.

Wallerstein began his tenure as President of Baruch College on August 2, 2010. In this capacity, he successfully concluded the Baruch Means Business fundraising campaign, reestablished the endowment of the Weissman School of Arts & Sciences, created the first outdoor public space (a plaza created by closing a city street) in the College's history and also the first student center.  He also led an initiative to expand the College's graduate programs, including new Master's degree in International Affairs and Arts Administration. In 2016, President Wallerstein successfully secured a $30 million endowment gift to name Baruch's third school as the Austin W. Marxe School of Public and International Affairs.

Wallerstein was  elected a member of the Council on Foreign Relations in 1989 and a Fellow of the National Academy of Public Administration (2006) and the American Association for the Advancement of Science (2015). In 2021, he was appointed as a Non-resident Senior Fellow on U.S. Foreign Policy at the Chicago Council on Global Affairs.

References

External links
Maxwell School CV 
Baruch College, Office of the President 

American political scientists
Living people
Dartmouth College alumni
Maxwell School of Citizenship and Public Affairs alumni
MIT School of Humanities, Arts, and Social Sciences alumni
Presidents of Baruch College
Year of birth missing (living people)
Syracuse University faculty
Baruch College faculty
George Washington University faculty
Georgetown University faculty
Johns Hopkins University faculty
National Defense University faculty